Barmouth railway station serves the seaside town of Barmouth in Gwynedd, Wales. The station is on the Cambrian Coast Railway with passenger services to Harlech, Porthmadog, Pwllheli, Tywyn, Aberdovey, Machynlleth and Shrewsbury. Between Morfa Mawddach and Barmouth the railway crosses the Afon Mawddach on the Barmouth Bridge.

History
The station (opened in 1867) originally extended further south, with a platform for trains to Dolgellau and Ruabon on the south side of the level crossing. This platform became disused following the closure of the Dolgellau line in 1965, but remained in situ with its waiting room until the early 1990s. It was demolished to make way for a bus stop and car park. The goods yard was redeveloped around the same time by Co-operative Retail Services and, as at Tywyn and Pwllheli, is now occupied by a supermarket.

Until the 1960s there was a summer service between London Paddington and Pwllheli, via Birmingham Snow Hill, Shrewsbury and Machynlleth.

The station signal box, also on the south side of the level crossing, became disused in the 1980s as the Cambrian Line's traditional signalling system was replaced with radio signalling (RETB).

Facilities

The southbound platform was improved in 2003 and is now home to Barmouth's tourist information centre. The station has a staffed ticket office and the tourist information centre provides a travel information service. There are no toilets within the station building.

Services
On Sundays, there is a single service each way all year, with extra trains in the summer. All services at Barmouth are provided by Transport for Wales using its Class 158 DMUs.

From 3 January 2014, train services were suspended due to major infrastructure damage at several locations along the line caused by storm-force winds and the resultant tidal surges. Part of the sea wall to the north near  was swept away, leading to severe damage to the formation which closed the line for 5 months, whilst further south a section of embankment at Tonfannau was washed out. Network Rail restored service to Barmouth from the south on 10 February 2014, and the line as far north as Harlech in May the same year. The northern end of the route beyond  remained closed until 1 September 2014 due to the reconstruction of the Pont Briwet viaduct.

Gallery

References

Further reading

External links 

Railway stations in Gwynedd
DfT Category E stations
Former Cambrian Railway stations
Railway stations in Great Britain opened in 1867
Railway stations served by Transport for Wales Rail
Barmouth